Meu Bem, Meu Mal (My Good, My Evil in English) is a Brazilian telenovela produced and broadcast at 8:00pm by TV Globo, October 29, 1990 to May 18, 1991, in 173 episodes.

Plot 

Lázaro Venturini, majority shareholder of Venturini Designers, is forced to live with Ricardo Miranda, who holds 30% stake in the company and represents the adultery of his late wife, Maria Helena. Ricardo holds a secret affair with Isadora Venturini (also a shareholder of the company), the widow of Claudius, son of Lázaro, and hated by the patriarch. But both Ricardo and Isadora are victims of hatred of others.

Ricardo was responsible for the ruin of Philip. His daughter, Patricia, plans revenge and becomes involved with Ricardo, even though much younger than he and a friend of his troubled daughter, Jessica.

Isadora joins socialite Mimi Toledo and her manicure, Berenice. Mimi Toledo was in love with the late husband of Isadora. Berenice wants to avenge her daughter's, Fernanda, humiliation imposed by Isadora, who did not accept the girl as his girlfriend's son, Marco Antônio. This puts Doca's revenge on the scene. Doca's a poor boy who, by Mimi Toledo, infiltrates high society as Eduardo Costabrava, and is madly in love with the daughter of Isadora, Victoria.

Cast

Crossover with Ti Ti Ti
One of the most famous characters in Meu Bem, Meu Mal, Divina Magda (played by Vera Zimmermann) returns in the 2010 telenovela Ti Ti Ti, as a recurring character and an ally of one of the protagonists of the soap opera, Jacques Leclair (played by Alexandre Borges).

In Ti Ti Ti, it is heavily implied by Jacques' loyal assistant, Clotilde (played by Juliana Alves), that Divina Magda is a black widow and that she would have intentionally killed two of the men with whom she had a romantic relationship: Dom Lázaro Venturini (played by Lima Duarte), the protagonist of Meu Bem, Meu Mal and Porfírio Tavares (played by Guilherme Karam), with whom he formed the most iconic couple there.

References

External links

1990 Brazilian television series debuts
1991 Brazilian television series endings
1990 telenovelas
TV Globo telenovelas
Brazilian telenovelas
Portuguese-language telenovelas